St. Patrick Catholic High School is a private, Roman Catholic high school in Biloxi, Mississippi.  It is located in the Roman Catholic Diocese of Biloxi. The school began as a merger between Mercy Cross High School in Biloxi and St. John High School in Gulfport which were both heavily affected by Hurricane Katrina.

Background
St. Patrick Catholic High School opened August 13, 2007.  The first Catholic high school in Biloxi was Sacred Heart Academy which opened in 1875 as a co-educational school. In 1942 it was decided to open a separate school for boys. This school was named Notre Dame High School. In 1980 it was decided to bring the students back together into one school. This school was named Mercy Cross after the Mercy nuns who opened Sacred Heart High School and the Holy Cross brothers who opened Notre Dame High School.

The first Catholic high school in Gulfport was St. Francis de Sales High School which opened in 1901 and was later renamed St. John High School.

In 2007 the schools in Biloxi and Gulfport came together when Mercy Cross High School in Biloxi and St. John High School in Gulfport combined into St. Patrick Catholic High School.

Recognition

 St. Patrick Catholic High School was named the best Catholic High School in the state of Mississippi by Niche in 2019 and has held that honor since in 2020 and 2021.
In 2019, St. Patrick Catholic High School was added to the U.S. Department of Education's list of Blue Ribbon Schools.
 St. Patrick Catholic High School has been recognized by Niche as having a "C" rating for diversity, as well as recognizing in polling that on average, two-thirds of students feel safe at the school, and half feel happy. 89.5% of the school is white. Niche also recognizes that just over one-third of the school student body believes that "kids at this school are friendly," and words that come to mind for students include "Conservative, close-minded, diverse, friendly, unhappy, and unique," with "conservative" coming up in 29% of student responses, and the rest at 14%.

Athletics and Activities

St. Patrick is a member of the Mississippi High School Activities Association and competes at the 2A level. The school's consistently strong athletic program has won 41 state championships since its founding in 2007. Currently the school provides students with opportunities to participate in:

Band

Basketball

Baseball

Cheer – State Champions 2008

Cross Country – State Champions (Men) 2017, 2018, 2020 (Women) 2007, 2009, 2010, 2011, 2012, 2015, 2016, 2018, 2019, 2020 

Dance – State Champions 2007, 2008, 2009, 2010, 2011

Football

Golf – State Champions (Men) 2008, 2009, 2012, 2013, 2014 (Women) 2009, 2010, 2011, 2012 

Powerlifting

Soccer – State Champions (Men) 2014, 2016, 2017 

Softball – State Champions 2012, 2013, 2014, 2018 

Swim

Tennis

Track – State Champions (Men) 2021 (Women) 2010, 2011, 2018, 2019, 2021  

Volleyball

Controversy

 Sexual controversy: In 2014, a member of the St. Patrick's staff, a mathematics teacher, was arrested and escorted off campus by the Federal Bureau of Investigation due to one count each of transportation of a minor to engage in sexual activity and interstate travel with intent to engage in illicit sexual conduct with a minor. William Richard Pryor confessed to molesting eight boys from 1973 to 2005 while they were students at Bayou View Middle School.
 Racial controversy: In 2016, a photo circulated of a member of the St. Patrick's softball team in the dugout during a game wearing a monkey mask, insinuating racist intent. The school opened an investigation and found no wrongdoing. "The whole idea behind it is to get them fired up and have fun in the dugout. I honestly from the bottom of my heart do not believe that it was the intent of that student to offend anyone," said Matthew Buckley, principal. In contrast, racist behavior, including "calling them [the] Philadelphia team and crowd apes, monkeys and the N-word." Superintendent Mike Ladner responded to these allegations by stating that it is standard behavior for students to wear animal masks in the dugouts, even going so far as to have named it "The Zoo."
The response provided by the Superintendent contradicts what the school principal said, with the Superintendent saying the team simply calls its dugout "The Zoo," while in contrast, the principal stated that the team was hosting a themed event, and different members were wearing different masks. "Buckley said the team chose the theme "The Zoo" and was emulating other SEC college teams that wear masks and props during games." Dr. Buckley also argues that the allegations of racist remarks were untrue, as they were not reported to the opposing team's coach. The remarks were reported to news agencies.

Notable Staff
Principals: Bobby Trosclair served as principal from its opening in 2007 but suddenly resigned from the position on January 11, 2012 for unnamed reasons. After his resignation, Trosclair was replaced by Renee McDaniel. McDaniel was principal until 2016, being replaced by Dr. Matt Buckley. Buckley served as principal starting in 2016 but suddenly resigned March 16, 2023 for unnamed reasons. Buckley was set to become superintendent for the Diocese of Biloxi prior to his resignation. Trey Bailey, the Director of Athletics, was chosen as interim principal after Buckley's exit. 
Vice Principals: Dr. Matt Buckley was vice principal from June 2013 to 2016. Anthony Gruich was vice principal until suddenly being dismissed March 16, 2023, for unnamed reasons.

Notes and references

External links

 School Website

Buildings and structures in Biloxi, Mississippi
Educational institutions established in 2007
Private middle schools in Mississippi
Roman Catholic Diocese of Biloxi
Catholic secondary schools in Mississippi
Schools in Harrison County, Mississippi
2007 establishments in Mississippi